St Matthew's Church, Cotham is a Gothic Revival building in the Cotham area of Bristol, England.

History
The foundations of the church were completed between 1833–35 and designed by Thomas Rickman who was a major figure in the Gothic Revival.. The church is now classed as a Grade II listed.

The roof is not visible and has an Aisle nave and West tower in the Gothic Revival style. The West front has a central four-stage tower with diagonal stone structures and an octagonal South-West stair turret.

See also
 Churches in Bristol
 Grade II listed buildings in Bristol

References

19th-century Church of England church buildings
Church of England church buildings in Bristol
Diocese of Bristol
Grade II listed churches in Bristol
Churches completed in 1835
Thomas Rickman buildings
Gothic Revival church buildings in England